Transmembrane protein 18 also known as TMEM18 is a protein which in humans is encoded by the TMEM18 gene.

Function 
TMEM18 seems to affect energy levels through insulin and glucagon signaling, and in flies, its downregulation induces a metabolic state resembling type-II diabetes

Overexpression of the TMEM18 protein increases the migration capacity of neural stem cells while inactivation of TMEM18 results in almost complete loss of migration activity.

The TMEM18 gene is ubiquitously expressed in both mammalian and fly tissues, which suggests a basic cellular function. In the mouse brain, it is found in the majority of all cells, but is more abundant in neurons than other cell types.

Clinical significance 
Genetic variants in the proximity of the TMEM18 gene are associated with obesity, insulin levels, and blood sugar levels

Evolutionary history
The TMEM18 gene  has a long evolutionary history as it is present in both plants and animals. The TMEM18 protein's amino acid sequence is well conserved, which suggests that it has retained its function since the divergence of human and plants. The gene seems to have been lost in two separate lineages, but is not found duplicated in any analyzed genomes. Hence, it is not essential for eukaryotic organisms, but there appears to be selection against multiple copies of the TMEM18 gene.

References

Further reading